Islam in Macau is a minority religion in the region. Currently there are around more than 400 Muslims in Macau in which they call themselves as The Macau Islamic Society. According to the Islamic Union of Hong Kong, together with all of the foreign Muslim workers combined (such as from Bangladesh, India, Indonesia and Pakistan), Muslims in Macau accounted for more than 10,000 people.

History

Yuan Dynasty
Islam has been present in Macau since the Yuan Dynasty. It is generally accepted that Islam were brought to Macau by traders from Middle East and Persia during that time until Qing Dynasty era. Some of this evidence can be found at the Muslim Cemetery nearby Macau Mosque where some of the tombs dated back to hundreds of years ago.

Portuguese Macau
During the Portuguese rule of Macau, many Muslims came from South Asia with the Portuguese Army. In the 1880s, they founded a Mosque for their prayer place.

During the World War II, many Hui people escaped to then-Portuguese Macau from the Republic of China to avoid the devastation from the war. Many of them are from Zhaoqing in Kwangtung province. However, many of them moved to Hong Kong after the end of world war. Some Muslim also came to Macau from Northwest China after the end of Chinese Civil War in 1949.

Before the Macau handover from Portugal to China in 1999, the Islamic Union of Hong Kong used to provide about HK$150,000 to support the Muslim community in Macau.

Macau SAR
Over the past ten years, the Muslim community in Macau has grown several folds to more than 10,000 with the arrival of Muslim workers from South and South East Asia, working at various sectors in Macau.

Mosque

Macau currently has one mosque, which is the Macau Mosque, located at 4 Ramal Dos Moros in Our Lady of Fatima Parish. The mosque was built in the 1980s by the Muslim people from the second wave of generation during the Portuguese-ruled of Macau. This mosque is specially crowded during Sunday where most of the employees are having their work break days.

Muslim festivities
Every year during Eid al-Adha, Muslims in Macau gather at Macau Mosque to celebrate the Muslim festivity by performing prayer and animal slaughtering for the needy and poor. The same thing also happen during the annual Eid al-Fitr celebration which is held at the mosque.

Muslim cemetery

Macau has one Muslim cemetery. Built in 1854, it located within the same area as Macau Mosque. Some of their style are of Persian origin with writing in Farsi, Arabic, Chinese, English and Portuguese. Some of the tombs dated hundreds of years ago. The cemetery consists of around 120 graves.

Muslim food

As of January 2015, there are five Halal restaurants and shops selling Halal food in Macau, both in Macau Peninsula and Taipa. Macau's first Halal restaurant was launched in 2012, which is called the Taste of India at Macau Fisherman's Wharf, serving Halal Indian and Portuguese cuisines. It took them three years to obtain the Halal certification.

Muslim name
Macau Muslim people usually have typical name such as Fatimah, Soraya, Umar etc.

Muslim majority or Islamic-related organizations

Islamic Association of Macau
The Islamic Association of Macau (IAM; ; Portuguese: Associação Islâmica de Macau) is an Islamic organization in Macau founded in 1935. The headquarters of the organization is at the Macau Mosque. The Islamic Union of Hong Kong in Hong Kong provides annual budget and subsidy to the IAM so that the association can continue to look after the interests of Muslims in Macau and to propagate Islam in the region. The current President of IAM is Ahmed Din Khan and the Vice President is Fazal Dad.

Peduli Indonesian Migrant Workers Concern Group
The Peduli Indonesian Migrant Workers Concern Group was established in 2009 in Macau. The group assists the Indonesian workers in Macau, such as explaining about Macau immigration law, employment documents translation etc. The group currently has around 350 members. It offers English classes, computer courses and holds many activities, such as visits to elderly homes, AIDS campaigns, hip-hop competitions etc.

Muslim tourism
To attract more Muslim tourists from Southeast Asia, the Macau Government Tourism Office has been engaging in several efforts to give a new perception that Macau is not only a gaming region. Over the past two years, the government has been engaging in seminars on Muslim practices during travel, encouraging more restaurants to get halal certification from Hong Kong and requesting hotels to reconstructing their lobby so that visitors do not have to go through casinos when going to restaurants or their rooms.

Contemporary issues
Muslims in Macau are often faced with time availability to pray, because most of them time they have only one break during their working period, which is not enough to hold two daily prayers. Some Muslim women workers also sometimes face difficulties to keep wearing their veil during working time, although this has never been a major issues in Macau.

See also
 Islam in China
 Religion in Macau

References